Ellis Lamar McCarthy (born July 13, 1994) is an American football defensive tackle who is currently a free agent. He played college football with the UCLA Bruins.

High school career
McCarthy played football at Monrovia High School for coach Ryan Maddox, where he was an All-American defensive tackle.  He also played in the U.S. Army All-American Bowl in San Antonio, where he had originally committed to California. He was named to the first-team USA Today All-American squad.  He was an All-CIF Mid-Valley Division selection at defensive line. He helped his team post a 23-5 record over his senior and junior seasons. He was the Pasadena Star-News Two-time Defensive Player of the Year. As a junior, he was credited with 69 tackles and 11 sacks.  He made 55 tackles, five sacks, three fumble recoveries as a senior. He was named U.S. Air Force Medium Schools second-team All-American.

Also a standout track & field athlete, McCarthy was one of the state's top performers in the throwing events. He posted personal-bests of 17.94 (58 ft, 8 in) meters in the shot put and 52.44 meters (172 ft) in the discus.

Regarded as a five-star recruit by Rivals.com, McCarthy was ranked as the No. 4 defensive tackle prospect in his class, named No. 10 defensive lineman in the nation according to SuperPrep and the No. 8 player in the CA/NV/HI region. Rated as the No. 21 recruit in the nation and No. 2 recruit in California according to Rivals.com, as well as the nation's No. 4 defensive tackle. A five-star recruit according to Scout.com and the nation's No. 2 defensive tackle. He was also an All-American according to Tom Lemming.

College career
McCarthy played as a true freshman for the UCLA Bruins.  In 2013, he made 31 tackles, including two for a loss, and was named the team's most improved player on defense. He was also named an All-Pac-12 honorable mention. He did not start any games in 2014, making 21 tackles and three sacks while playing behind Kenny Clark and Eddie Vanderdoes. After the season, McCarthy entered for the NFL draft, which surprised many, considering the fact that he did not start in 2014. He made eight career starts for the Bruins.

See also
 USA Today All-USA high school football team

References

External links
UCLA Bruins bio

1994 births
Living people
People from Monrovia, California
American football defensive tackles
UCLA Bruins football players
Players of American football from California
Sportspeople from Los Angeles County, California